Salboni Institute of Technology,  is a self-financed polytechnic located in Salboni, Paschim Medinipur district, West Bengal.

About college
This polytechnic is affiliated to the West Bengal State Council of Technical Education,  and recognized by AICTE, New Delhi. This polytechnic offers diploma courses in Electrical, Mechanical and Civil Engineering.

See also

References

External links
Official website WBSCTE
Salboni Institute of Technology

Universities and colleges in Paschim Medinipur district
Technical universities and colleges in West Bengal
Educational institutions in India with year of establishment missing